St Joseph's College in Dumfries, South West Scotland, is a Roman Catholic secondary school. It began as a Catholic boys' boarding school run by Marist Brothers.

History

St Joseph's College was founded in 1875 as both a boarding school and the first Novitiate for the training of Marist Brothers in Great Britain. Brother Walfrid, the man who founded Celtic Football Club, also helped to found the school. The school became part of the state school system in 1981, but still accepts Catholic students as priority. The school was a boys' school to begin with, and the first female pupils were admitted as day pupils in the early 1970s.

Buildings

The school was originally located elsewhere in Dumfries but was moved to its current location when a local businessman bought the land and donated it to the Marist Brothers. Numerous expansions to the original build have been made: the assembly hall, extensions to the mathematics and French departments, a new separate building for the Religious Education classrooms, and another new building which contains the dining hall and physical education halls. After the school became public, the buildings transferred to Dumfries and Galloway Council in January 2008, following the sale of part of the school playing fields at Maryfield, for the new medical centre at Gillbrae. The Marist Brothers then had no involvement with the school.

Campus

The school campus is made up of two buildings: The Ewan Duncan Building and the main school building housing the classrooms for all of the subjects (the gym hall and cafeteria being removed in the renovations). The grounds contain gardens and lawn at the front and back of the main building, and a playing field area roughly the size of three football fields and several hockey and tennis courts are also included.

Notable former pupils

 Frank Brogan, Celtic footballer
 Jim Brogan, Celtic and Scotland football player
 Sir Charles Forte, Kt., founder of the Forte group of hotels
 Philip G. Fothergill, botanist
 Ian Harnett (1926–2001), Scottish footballer
 John McDermott (Scottish artist)
 Allan McNish, a racing driver born in Dumfries and three-time winner of Le Mans 24. He returned in recent years to talk at the annual awards ceremony.
 Sir Frank Williams, founder and team principal of the Williams Formula One racing team

References

External links
Information at Dumfries and Galloway Council page
Scottish Schools Online entry
Past Pupils Association website

Marist Brothers schools
Catholic secondary schools in Dumfries and Galloway
Dumfries
1875 establishments in Scotland
Educational institutions established in 1875